Tichaya Boonlert (born February 14, 1997, in Nonthaburi) is a Thai indoor volleyball player. She is a current member of the Thailand women's national volleyball team. With her team PSL F2 Logistics Manila she competed at the 2016 FIVB Women's Club World Championship.

Career
Boonlert won silver medal with her U23 national team during the 2015 Asian U23 Asian Championship and the bronze medal at the 2016 Asian Cup Championship.

Clubs 
  3BB Nakornnont (2012–2022)
  PSL Manila (2016)
  Hóa chất Đức Giang Hà Nội (2023–present)

Awards

Individuals
 2014 PEA Junior Championship – "Most Valuable Player"
 2014–15 Thailand League – "Best Setter"
 2016 PSL Invitational Cup – "Best Setter"

References

External links
 FIVB Biography

1997 births
Living people
Tichaya Boonlert
Tichaya Boonlert
Tichaya Boonlert
Southeast Asian Games medalists in volleyball
Competitors at the 2017 Southeast Asian Games
Tichaya Boonlert